Virginia Ruzici won the singles title at the 1978 BMW Challenge tennis tournament, defeating Betty Stöve in the final 5–7, 6–2, 7–5, winning her 5th title on the WTA Tour.

Seeds
A champion seed is indicated in bold text while text in italics indicates the round in which that seed was eliminated.

  Chris Evert (semifinals)
  Virginia Wade (quarterfinals)
  Betty Stöve (final)
  Kerry Reid (semifinals)
  Virginia Ruzici (champion)
  Marita Redondo (first round)
  Regina Marsikova (first round)
  Mima Jausovec (quarterfinals)

Draw

References
 1978 BMW International

Men's Singles
Singles
Sport in Bournemouth